Mehmed Alagić (8 July 1947 – 7 March 2003) was a Bosnian general in the Army of the Republic of Bosnia and Herzegovina. He was on trial for war crimes in the International Criminal Tribunal for the former Yugoslavia in The Hague but died before the trial had concluded.

Military career
Mehmed Alagić graduated from the YPA (JNA) military academy in Banja Luka in 1970. Later he became the commander of the military academy. In 1986, he became commander of the 36th mechanised brigade and in 1989 commander of the Zrenjanin brigade as part of the Novi Sad Corps.

Bosnian War
Alagić left the JNA in February 1991. On 13 December 1993 he served in the 17th Krajina Brigade of the 3rd Corps of the Army of the Republic of Bosnia and Herzegovina. On 8 March 1993 he became commander of the Operational Group (OG) Bosnian Krajina within the 3rd Corps. He became commander of the 3rd Corps on 1 November 1993.

After the war
In March 1996, as a member of the SDA party, Alagić was elected for the mayor of Sanski Most municipality and a member of the Federation of Bosnia and Herzegovina's Parliament.

In 2001 he was indicted for war crimes at the ICTY, but died before the trial commenced. Subsequent to his death, the case was terminated. His co-defendants were convicted and served jail time.

In December 2019, Sarajevo Canton initiated a process to name a major street in the city in General Alagić's honour.

Military Ranks

JNA
1991 - Lieutenant Colonel

Army of the Republic of Bosnia and Herzegovina
1994 - Brigadier General

References

1947 births
2003 deaths
People from Sanski Most
Bosniaks of Bosnia and Herzegovina
Bosnia and Herzegovina Muslims
People indicted by the International Criminal Tribunal for the former Yugoslavia
Bosnia and Herzegovina generals
Officers of the Yugoslav People's Army